Admiral Harold Page Smith (February 17, 1904 – January 4, 1993) was a United States Navy four-star admiral who served as Commander in Chief, United States Naval Forces Europe/Commander in Chief, United States Naval Forces, Eastern Atlantic and Mediterranean from 1960 to 1963 and Supreme Allied Commander Atlantic/Commander in Chief, Allied Command Atlantic/Commander in Chief, United States Atlantic Fleet from 1963 to 1965.

Military career
Smith attended the United States Naval Academy and graduated in its class of 1924.

References

1904 births
1993 deaths
People from Grand Bay, Alabama
Recipients of the Legion of Merit
United States Naval Academy alumni
United States Navy admirals